Sankt Gilgen (Central Bavarian: St. Gieng) is a village by Lake Wolfgang in the Austrian state of Salzburg, in the Salzkammergut region.

History
St. Gilgen was first mentioned in documents in 1376. In 1863, shipping on Lake Wolfgang started and brought attention to the little village. The construction of the Salzkammergut-Lokalbahn in 1893 led to another increase in tourism. Rich Viennese, such as the surgeon Theodor Billroth, started to build summer residences there.

Geography
Sankt Gilgen is situated in the north-western shore of the lake Wolfgangsee, close to Strobl and to the Upper Austrian municipality of St. Wolfgang. It has 3,784 inhabitants, lies 545 metres above sea level and covers an area of 98.67 square kilometres.

Overview
The parish church is dedicated to Saint Aegidius (Latin), in English Saint Giles, which is reflected in the name of the town, Sankt Gilgen.

St. Gilgen is a well-known travel destination. Boats from St. Gilgen sail around the Wolfgangsee, providing transport and views of the surrounding mountains.  The hermitage of the original St. Gilgen may be seen, behind a chapel, in the Falkenstein cliffs west of St. Wolfgang and east of Fürberg.

In 2005 St. Gilgen was promoted as the "Mozart Village" by the Wolfgangsee Tourist Board. Although Wolfgang Amadeus Mozart never visited St. Gilgen (as he had intended to), his grandfather worked in the town, his mother was born in St. Gilgen, and his sister Nannerl moved there after her marriage. The village now boasts a first-class international school, the  St. Gilgen International School.

The Gut Aich Priory (Benedictine) was founded in St. Gilgen in 1993.

Notable people
 
Anna Maria Walburga Pertl (1720–1778), mother of Wolfgang Amadeus Mozart
August Brunetti-Pisano (1870–1943), composer 
Brother David Steindl-Rast (1926–Present), Benedictine monk and interfaith lecturer on peace and gratitude
Michael Jeannée (born 1943), journalist 
Miguel Herz-Kestranek (born 1948), actor 
Hubert Raudaschl (born 1942), sailboat manufacturer and former olympic athlete
Helmut Kohl (1930-2017), the former German Chancellor used to reside in the town during summer.

See also 
Salzkammergut
Wolfgangsee
Salzkammergut-Lokalbahn
Schafberg
Schafbergbahn
Brunnwinkl

References

External links 

 St Gilgen — community website
Wolfgangsee Tourist Board

Cities and towns in Salzburg-Umgebung District